Modern synthesis is a group of theories in evolutionary biology.

Modern synthesis may also refer to:

 Modern synthesis (20th century), a combination of Darwin's theory of evolution with natural selection and Mendel's findings on heredity
 Modern Synthesis, a 2016 album by English rock band Area 11

See also
Synthesis (disambiguation)